The Agricultural and Processed Food Products Export Development Authority (APEDA) is an Indian Apex-Export Trade Promotion Active government body. 

APEDA is the premier body of export promotion of fresh vegetables and fruits. It provides the crucial interface between farmers, storehouses, packers, exporters, surface transport, ports, Railways, Airways, and all others engaged in export trade to the international market.

History 
It was set up by the Ministry of Commerce and Industry under the Agriculture and Processed Food products Export Development Authority. The Act was passed by Parliament in December 1985. It was formed and came into effect from 13 February 1986 by the notification issued in the Gazette of India.

See also
Federation of Indian Export Organisations

References 

Agricultural marketing in India
Export promotion agencies of India